The 2014–15 season will be MTK Budapest FC's 105th competitive season, 3rd consecutive season in the OTP Bank Liga and 126th year in existence as a football club.

First team squad

Transfers

Summer

In:

Out:

List of Hungarian football transfers summer 2014

Winter

In:

Out:

List of Hungarian football transfers winter 2014–15

Statistics

Appearances and goals
Last updated on 31 May 2015.

|-
|colspan="14"|Youth players:

|-
|colspan="14"|Out to loan:

|-
|colspan="14"|Players no longer at the club:

|}

Top scorers
Includes all competitive matches. The list is sorted by shirt number when total goals are equal.

Last updated on 31 May 2015

Disciplinary record
Includes all competitive matches. Players with 1 card or more included only.

Last updated on 31 May 2015

Overall
{|class="wikitable"
|-
|Games played || 46 (30 OTP Bank Liga, 4 Hungarian Cup and 12 Hungarian League Cup)
|-
|Games won || 30 (18 OTP Bank Liga, 3 Hungarian Cup and 9 Hungarian League Cup)
|-
|Games drawn || 3 (3 OTP Bank Liga, 0 Hungarian Cup and 0 Hungarian League Cup)
|-
|Games lost || 13 (9 OTP Bank Liga, 1 Hungarian Cup and 3 Hungarian League Cup)
|-
|Goals scored || 82
|-
|Goals conceded || 43
|-
|Goal difference || +39
|-
|Yellow cards || 60
|-
|Red cards || 4
|-
|rowspan="1"|Worst discipline ||  Dragan Vukmir (11 , 1 )
|-
|rowspan="1"|Best result || 9–0 (A) v Jászapáti - Magyar Kupa - 09-09-2014
|-
|rowspan="1"|Worst result || 0–5 (A) v Videoton - OTP Bank Liga - 23-08-2014
|-
|rowspan="1"|Most appearances ||  Zsolt Horváth (39 appearances)
|-
|rowspan="1"|Top scorer ||  József Kanta (12 goals)
|-
|Points || 93/138 (67.39%)
|-

Nemzeti Bajnokság I

Matches

Classification

Results summary

Results by round

Hungarian Cup

League Cup

Knockout phase

References

External links
 Eufo
 Official Website
 UEFA
 fixtures and results

MTK Budapest FC seasons
Mtk Budapest